At-Bashy (Kyrgyz: Ат-Башы) is a village in the Naryn Region of Kyrgyzstan, about 35km southwest of Naryn on the main highway to the Torugart Pass. It is the seat of At-Bashy District. The At-Bashy Range to the south extends to Lake Chatyr-Kul.  The river At-Bashy comes in from the east and then runs northwest through a gorge in the Baybiche-Too range to join the Naryn near Dostuk. It is the last considerable settlement before the Chinese border.  The highway, built in 1906, runs southwest between the Baybiche-Too and At-Bashy ranges before turning south and then east to reach the pass. Its population was 14,655 in 2021.

Population

References

Populated places in Naryn Region